10, Janpath is a public-owned house on Janpath. At the time of Rajiv Gandhi's assassination in 1991, while he was campaigning for a second term as Prime Minister of India, 10, Janpath was his official residence, although he lived at 7, Lok Kalyan Marg while he was Prime Minister. 10, Janpath remains the residence of his widow Sonia Gandhi, who is a former President of Indian National Congress party. The national headquarters of Indian National Congress (INC) is right behind it on 24, Akbar Road. It was the residence of India's second Prime Minister, Lal Bahadur Shastri (1964–1966) and where his body lay in state on 11 January 1966. Today his biographical museum, Lal Bhadur Shastri Memorial is situated at 1, Motilal Nehru Place (formerly 10, Janpath), adjacent to the complex.

10, Janpath is spread over 15,181 square meters in New Delhi.

History
The house was the residence of Prime Minister Lal Bahadur Shastri who succeeded Jawaharlal Nehru in the 1960s. Adjacent to the complex, facing the roundabout is Lal Bahadur Shastri Memorial at  1, Motilal Nehru Place.

References

External links
 10 Janpath wikimapia
 10, Janpath Doors Are Shut

Indian National Congress
Government buildings in Delhi
Houses in India